Luke Farrell Kirby (born June 29, 1978) is an American-Canadian actor. In 2019, he won a Primetime Emmy Award for his guest role as Lenny Bruce on the television series The Marvelous Mrs. Maisel.

Early life
Kirby was born in Hamilton, Ontario, to American parents. His mother is from Brooklyn, New York, and his father grew up "along the eastern seaboard."  His parents moved from New York City, New York, to Canada in 1974. Kirby studied drama at the National Theatre School of Canada, a theatre conservatory which focuses on classical works, and graduated in 2000.

Career
Kirby has been performing since his teens after he was accepted at The National Theatre School of Canada. He graduated in May 2000 and after two auditions he began working on two separate projects: the CBS/Alliance mini-series Haven, and director Léa Pool's feature Lost and Delirious (2001).

Soon after, Kirby performed the role of Morgan in the Factory Theatre's production of Geometry in Venice in Toronto, a performance that garnered him a Best Actor nomination at the Dora Mavor Moore Awards. This was quickly followed by the role of Patroclus in Theatre for a New Audience's 2001 production of Troilus and Cressida, directed by Peter Hall in New York City. 

In 2006, Kirby performed in the Women's Project Theater production of Jump/Cut. Other theatre credits include Judith Thompson's premiere of Habitat at Canadian Stage followed by Daniel Brooks premiere of The Good Life at the Tarragon Theatre (both in Toronto). His latest theatre venture was in NYC where he performed the lead role in Defender of the Faith (Irish Repertory Theatre).

Kirby's first feature film was the role of Jim in Halloween: Resurrection (2002). Other film credits include lead roles in Peter Wellington's feature Luck and Mambo Italiano directed by Émile Gaudreault. Mambo Italiano received a gala presentation at the 2003 Toronto International Film Festival to a standing ovation and earned Kirby a Canadian Comedy Award Nomination. Kirby then performed in a part written for him in the feature film Shattered Glass produced by Cruise/Wagner. In 2007, he played the lead role of Ray Dokes opposite Rachael Leigh Cook and Keith Carradine in the Canadian feature All Hat. A 2009 film role had him opposite Lindsay Lohan in a feature titled Labor Pains.

In television, one of Kirby's favourite roles was the TMN/Showcase mini-series Slings and Arrows, featuring Canadian actors and directed by his friend Peter Wellington. Sex Traffic, a mini-series for Channel 4 and CBC that aired in the fall of 2004, had him working with British director David Yates, for which he received a Gemini nomination. That same year he received a second Gemini nomination for his guest starring role in the dramatic series The Eleventh Hour. In the fall of 2005, Kirby appeared as a series regular in HBO's Tell Me You Love Me, directed by Patricia Rozema. The first season aired in HBO in September 2007. He starred as Jimmy Burns in the 2009–2010 Canwest Global television series Cra$h & Burn.

In 2017, Kirby joined the cast of the Golden Globe winner The Marvelous Mrs. Maisel, an original series from Amazon, as the comedian Lenny Bruce, for which he received a Primetime Emmy Award for Outstanding Guest Actor in a Comedy Series.

From December 2019 through January 2020, Kirby starred in the Off-Broadway play Judgment Day at New York's Park Avenue Armory.

Filmography

Film

Television

Awards and nominations
 Nominated: Canadian Comedy Award for Pretty Funny Performance (2004 for Mambo Italiano)
 Nominated: Gemini Award for Best Performance by an Actor in a Featured Supporting Role in a Dramatic Program or Mini-Series (2005 for Sex Traffic)
 Nominated: Gemini Award for Best Performance by an Actor in a Guest Role Dramatic Series (2005 for The Eleventh Hour)
 Nominated: Gemini Award for Best Performance by an Actor in a Continuing Leading Dramatic Role (2010 for Cra$h & Burn)
 Won: Primetime Emmy Award for Outstanding Guest Actor in a Comedy Series (2019 for The Marvelous Mrs. Maisel)
 Nominated: Primetime Emmy Award for Outstanding Guest Actor in a Comedy Series (2020 for The Marvelous Mrs. Maisel)

References

External links

Luke Kirby at Yahoo! Movies
Luke Kirby at Flixster

1978 births
Living people
Canadian male film actors
Canadian male television actors
Canadian people of American descent
Male actors from Hamilton, Ontario
National Theatre School of Canada alumni
Primetime Emmy Award winners
20th-century Canadian male actors
21st-century Canadian male actors